Morgan Whitehead is a former American rugby union player. She was a member of the  squad that won the inaugural 1991 Women's Rugby World Cup in Wales. She played in the final against England, Eagles coach Kevin O'Brien opted for a more mobile back-row of Claire Godwin, Whitehead and Kathy Flores.

Whitehead and the 1991 World Cup squad were inducted into the United States Rugby Hall of Fame in 2017.

References 

Year of birth missing (living people)
Living people
Female rugby union players
American female rugby union players
United States women's international rugby union players